Kevin Michael Shattenkirk (born January 29, 1989) is an American professional ice hockey defenseman who currently plays for the Anaheim Ducks of the National Hockey League (NHL). He previously played for the Colorado Avalanche, St. Louis Blues, Washington Capitals, New York Rangers and Tampa Bay Lightning. He was drafted in the first round, 14th overall, at the 2007 NHL Entry Draft by the Avalanche and made his NHL debut with them in 2010. Shattenkirk won the Stanley Cup as a member of the Lightning in 2020.

Playing career
Shattenkirk grew up in New Rochelle, New York where he attended Iona Prep Lower School. As a youth, he played in the 2002 Quebec International Pee-Wee Hockey Tournament with the New Jersey Devils minor ice hockey team.

Amateur
Shattenkirk was drafted 14th overall in the 2007 NHL Entry Draft by the Colorado Avalanche. He played youth hockey with the New Jersey Devils Youth Hockey Club before attending The Brunswick School in Greenwich, Connecticut. He was drafted by the USA Hockey National Team Development Program, and committed to Boston University of the NCAA's Hockey East conference, along with fellow 2007 Avalanche draft pick Colby Cohen.

After a solid freshman season with the Terriers in 2007–08, in which he was named to the Hockey East All-Freshman Team, Shattenkirk helped take the Terriers to the Frozen Four tournament in 2008–09. After being named in the NCAA Second All-American Team, Shattenkirk went on to help Boston University take the National Championship 4–3 against Miami University, assisting in the overtime, title-winning Colby Cohen goal.

Shattenkirk was named as co-captain, along with Brian Strait, of the Terriers for the 2009–10 season on April 21, 2009. However, after Strait turned professional, Shattenkirk became the sole captain of the Terriers and the first junior sole captain since the 1961–62 season. In 38 games with the Terriers, while focused more attentively to defense, he matched his sophomore goal total with 7 and posted 29 points to be named to the Inside College Hockey Preseason All-American and All-College Hockey News Preseason Second Teams. After defeat in the Hockey East semi-finals to the University of Maine, on April 3, 2010, Shattenkirk (along with Colby Cohen) was signed to three-year, entry-level contract with the Colorado Avalanche.

Professional

Colorado Avalanche 
On April 5, 2010, Shattenkirk was signed to an amateur try-out contract with the Avalanche's American Hockey League (AHL) affiliate, the Lake Erie Monsters, to conclude the 2009–10 season. On April 7, 2010, he made his professional debut, recording an assist and a shootout goal in a 5–4 victory over the Abbotsford Heat.

On November 4, 2010, Colorado recalled Shattenkirk from Lake Erie and made his NHL debut in a home game against the Vancouver Canucks that same day. Shattenkirk was one of 12 rookies selected to participate in the 2011 NHL All-Star festivities in Raleigh, North Carolina.

St. Louis Blues 
On February 19, 2011, in a swap of four former first-rounders, Shattenkirk, Chris Stewart and a conditional second-round pick were traded to the St. Louis Blues in exchange for Erik Johnson, Jay McClement and a conditional first-round pick. Later that day, Shattenkirk made his home debut with the Blues at the Scottrade Center, recording an assist in a decisive 9–3 victory over the Anaheim Ducks.

With the NHL lockout effectively delaying the start to the 2012–13 season, on November 26, 2012, Shattenkirk signed a lockout contract in Finland, joining Blues teammate Kris Russell with HC TPS of the SM-liiga. He played in 12 games before the labor dispute was solved, scoring two goals and six points for TPS.

On June 26, 2013, Shattenkirk signed a four-year, $17 million extension with St. Louis.

Washington Capitals 
In the final year of his contract, during the 2016–17 season, the Blues were unable to work out an extension with Shattenkirk as he approached free agency. On February 27, 2017, prior to the trade deadline, Shattenkirk was traded (alongside Pheonix Copley) to the Washington Capitals in exchange for Zach Sanford, Brad Malone, a 2017 first-round draft pick and a conditional second-round draft pick in 2019. Shattenkirk left the Blues having played in 425 games and collecting 258 points, placing fifth all-time amongst defensemen in franchise history.

New York Rangers 
On July 1, 2017, Shattenkirk signed a four-year, $26.65 million contract with the New York Rangers. Shattenkirk had been connected to the Rangers via rumors for months leading up to his free agency, which further heated up following a June 23 trade in which New York traded away Derek Stepan, clearing up cap space. On January 19, 2018, it was announced Shattenkirk would have surgery to repair a torn meniscus in his left knee and that he would be out of the lineup indefinitely. It was later revealed he had torn the meniscus during training camp and had played through the first half of the season with it before opting for surgery. Even though he was initially expected to be able to return for the end of the regular season and for the 2018 Stanley Cup playoffs, the Rangers would fall out of playoff contention and eventually opted to shut down Shattenkirk for the season.

On July 31, 2019, Shattenkirk's contract was bought out by the New York Rangers after a disappointing 2018–19 season when he registered just 2 goals and 28 points in 73 games.

Tampa Bay Lightning 
Shattenkirk signed with the Tampa Bay Lightning on a one-year, $1.75 million deal for the 2019–20 season. As a member of the Lightning, Shattenkirk would win the Stanley Cup, recording 3 goals and 10 assists for 13 points in the playoffs.

Anaheim Ducks 
On October 9, 2020, Shattenkirk left the Lightning as a free agent and was signed to a three-year, $11.7 million contract with the Anaheim Ducks.

International play

Shattenkirk, entrenched in the US National Team Development Program, first represented the United States in the 2006 World U-17 Hockey Challenge, helping collect silver. The following year, as captain of the under-18 development program, Shattenkirk was selected to the 2007 IIHF World U18 Championships. He again contributed to the United States winning silver, gaining selection to the All-Star Team and named the Tournament's Best Defenseman.

Shattenkirk was named to the United States national team for the 2009 World Junior Championships.  Serving as an alternate captain and with expectations of helping the U.S. to a medal, Shattenkirk led all tournament defenseman in scoring with nine points and, despite a disappointing fifth-place team finish, was named as one of Team USA's top three players and praised for strong play by USA Hockey Executive Jim Johannson.

Following the completion of his rookie NHL season, Shattenkirk was chosen in his first men's tournament to represent the United States at the 2011 World Championships in Slovakia. In the opening game of the Championships, Shattenkirk scored his first full international goal in a 5–1 victory over Austria on April 30, 2011. Shattenkirk finished with three points in seven games before finishing in eighth place after losing in the quarter-finals to the Czech Republic, 4–0, on May 11, 2011.

On January 1, 2014, Shattenkirk was named to the United States national team for the 2014 Winter Olympics, along with St. Louis teammates David Backes and T. J. Oshie.

Career statistics

Regular season and playoffs

International

Awards and honors

References

External links

 

1989 births
Living people
AHCA Division I men's ice hockey All-Americans
American men's ice hockey defensemen
Anaheim Ducks players
Brunswick School alumni
Boston University Terriers men's ice hockey players
Colorado Avalanche draft picks
Colorado Avalanche players
HC TPS players
Ice hockey players from Connecticut
Ice hockey players from New York (state)
Ice hockey players at the 2014 Winter Olympics
Lake Erie Monsters players
National Hockey League All-Stars
National Hockey League first-round draft picks
New York Rangers players
Olympic ice hockey players of the United States
Sportspeople from New Rochelle, New York
Sportspeople from Greenwich, Connecticut
St. Louis Blues players
Stanley Cup champions
Tampa Bay Lightning players
Washington Capitals players